Orquesta Sinfónica Nacional may refer to:

 National Symphony Orchestra of Colombia, the re-establishment in 2004 of an orchestra founded in 1952
 National Symphony Orchestra (Dominican Republic), founded 1941
 National Symphony Orchestra (Peru), founded 1938
 National Symphony Orchestra (Mexico) founded 1949